The 2013 Florida Atlantic Owls baseball team represents Florida Atlantic University in the sport of baseball for the 2013 college baseball season.  The Owls compete in Division I of the National Collegiate Athletic Association (NCAA) and the Sun Belt Conference.  They play their home games at FAU Baseball Stadium, on the university's Boca Raton, Florida campus.  The team is coached by John McCormack, who is in his fifth season at Florida Atlantic.

2013 schedule and results

Regionals

Awards and honors

All-Conference
First Team All-Conference Honors
SP Austin Gomber (Sophomore)
SP Hugh Adams (Senior)
Second Team All-Conference Honors
OF Nathan Pittman (Senior)

2013 MLB First-Year Player Draft
FAU players selected in the 2013 MLB First-Year Player Draft:

Notes and references

External links
 The Official Website for Florida Atlantic Athletics

Florida Atlantic Owls baseball seasons
Florida Atlantic
Sun Belt Conference baseball champion seasons
2013 NCAA Division I baseball tournament participants